The 1954 FIFA World Cup qualification Group 6 contained Spain and Turkey.

Table

Matches

 

Spain and Turkey finished level on points, and a play-off on neutral ground was played to decide who would qualify.

Turkey qualified after drawing lots. Since the 1970 FIFA World Cup finals, goal difference has been used as a tiebreaker for future qualifying rounds. Had those rules been in place, Spain would have qualified, and Turkey would have been eliminated. A 14-year-old local (i.e. Roman) boy whose father worked at the stadium, Luigi Franco Gemma, picked Turkey's name from the lots with his eyes blindfolded.

Team stats

Head coach:  Sandro Puppo

Head coach:  Luis Iribarren

References

External links
FIFA official page
RSSSF – 1954 World Cup Qualification
Allworldcup

6
qual
1953–54 in Spanish football